Eremophila hillii, commonly known as Hill's emu bush, is a flowering plant in the figwort family, Scrophulariaceae and is endemic to the Nullarbor Plain in Australia. It is a dense shrub with many tangled branches, densely hairy stems, leaves and sepals and red or yellow petals.

Description
Its branches are densely covered with white or pale grey branched hairs, at least when young but become glabrous as they age. The leaves are densely crowded near the tips of the branches and are covered with a dense layer of branched hairs when young, becoming glabrous as they age.

The petal tube is red or orange-red, sometimes yellow and both the inside and outside of the tube have scattered glandular hairs. The 4 stamens extend beyond the end of the petal tube.

Taxonomy and naming 
The species was first formally described in 1967 by Elizabeth Anne Shaw and the description was published in Transactions of the Royal Society of South Australia. The specific epithet (hillii) honours "Ronald Hill of the Adelaide Botanic Garden".

Distribution and habitat
E. hillii grows in stony clay and calcareous soils in isolated populations growing on the Nullarbor Plain in South Australia and Western Australia.

Conservation status
Eremophila hillii is classified as "Priority Four" by the Government of Western Australia Department of Parks and Wildlife, meaning that is rare or near threatened.

Use in horticulture
Hill's emubush is a hardy and reliable shrub and some specimens have been in cultivation for up to 40 years. The bright red and orange-yellow forms make an attractive contrast when planted together. It can be propagated easily from cuttings and grown in a wide range of soils, including clay although it prefers a sunny aspect. It is both drought tolerant and frost resistant.

References

Flora of Western Australia
hillii
Flora of South Australia
Plants described in 1967